Perperek Knoll (Perperekska Mogila \per-pe-'rek-ska mo-'gi-la\) is a 360 m peak in Vidin Heights on Varna Peninsula, Livingston Island in the South Shetland Islands, Antarctica.  Partly ice-free southeast slopes.  Surmounting Kaliakra Glacier to the west and south.  The peak is named after the settlement of Perperek in the Rhodope Mountains hosting the remains of the Thracian holy town of Perperikon.

Location

Maps
 L.L. Ivanov et al. Antarctica: Livingston Island and Greenwich Island, South Shetland Islands (from English Strait to Morton Strait, with illustrations and ice-cover distribution). Scale 1:100000 topographic map. Sofia: Antarctic Place-names Commission of Bulgaria, 2005.
 L.L. Ivanov. Antarctica: Livingston Island and Greenwich, Robert, Snow and Smith Islands. Scale 1:120000 topographic map.  Troyan: Manfred Wörner Foundation, 2009.

Notes

References
 Bulgarian Antarctic Gazetteer. Antarctic Place-names Commission. (details in Bulgarian, basic data in English)
 Perperek Knoll. SCAR Composite Gazetteer of Antarctica

External links
 Perperek Knoll. Copernix satellite image

Hills of Livingston Island